El jinete sin cabeza (English: The Headless Horseman) is a 1957 Mexican Horror Western directed by Chano Urueta. The film centers on a mysterious stranger who rides into town as the locals begin talking about a legendary gunfighter as bodies soon litter the town in the stranger's wake.

Plot

A mysterious stranger on horseback rides into an unnamed Mexican town for an unknown purpose. The superstitious locals soon begin to talk of a legendary gunfighter with the speed to outdraw even the fastest hand. Tensions begin to rise as the stranger leaves a trail of bodies in his wake.

Cast
 Luis Aguilar – Reinaldo, el jinete
 Flor Silvestre – Margarita, la jueza
 Jaime Fernández – Fernando
 Pascual García Peña – Pascual
 Crox Alvarado – Don Álvaro
 Patricia Nieto – Julieta
 Guillermo Cramer – Doctor J. González
 Alberto Pedret – Don Julián Méndez
 Elvira Lodi – Tía Clotilde
 Carlos Suárez – Don Carlos Bustamante
 Salvador Godínez – Miembro secta
 Fernando Osés – Miembro secta

Production

El Jinete sin cabeza was the first film in what was originally a three-part serial called the "Headless Rider" series.

Release

Home media
The film was released on DVD by Reyes on December 11, 2003. It was later released by Laguna Films on March 30, 2004.

Reception

Author Michael R. Pitts in his book Western Movies: A Guide to 5,105 Feature Films called the film "[a] creepy, atmospheric horror western".

References

External links
 
 
 

1957 films
1957 horror films
1950s mystery films
1950s Western (genre) horror films
Films directed by Chano Urueta
Films shot in Mexico City
Mexican Western (genre) horror films
Mexican black-and-white films
Mexican mystery films
Mexican supernatural horror films
1950s Spanish-language films
1950s Mexican films